The Estonian Space Office (ESO) is the unit established within Enterprise Estonia by the Government of Estonia to facilitate membership in the European Space Agency and related commercial and research ties. In addition ESO serves as a contact point with the IAF, European Association for the International Space Year (EURISY) and EUMETSAT in procurement-related matters.

ESO is not a space agency. State space policy as it exists is managed through the Space Affairs Council at the Ministry of Economic Affairs and Communications. ESO functions as a centre for technology and business competence alongside Tartu Observatory which has responsibility for space science, space exploration and remote sensing. Various activities within the Framework Programmes for Research and Technological Development of the European Union for education, science and innovation, including funding for space programs, are coordinated by the Archimedes Foundation.

Since 2010, the Riigikogu has had a 'Space Studies Support Group' (Kosmose valdkonna toetusrühm) currently chaired by Anne Sulling.

See also
Space science in Estonia
Ene Ergma - Skytte medal recipient
ESTCube-1 - first Estonian satellite
ESTCube-2 - planned Estonian satellite

References

External links

European Space Agency

Science and technology in Estonia
Science and technology in Europe